Feed Tha Streets III is the third commercial mixtape by American rapper Roddy Ricch. It was released through Atlantic Records and Bird Vision Entertainment on November 18, 2022. The mixtape features guest appearances from Lil Durk and Ty Dolla Sign. Production was handled by Ambezza, Louis Yung, Orcutt & Buser, Sonic, Cubeatz, Beezo, Kevin Mitchell, Martin Brown, AlekBeatz, DY Krazy, B. March, Teddy Walton, Aaron Bow, Byrd, Mfoss, Slizer, Turbo, JetsonMade, Pooh Beatz, Shottie, Cam Griff, Bodi, Mustard, Brody, UV Killin Em, Will Stellar, and Luca Vialli. The mixtape was supported by three singles: "Stop Breathing", "Aston Martin Truck", and the Durk-assisted "Twin". It is the final installment of Ricch's Feed Tha Streets mixtape trilogy.

Background
On August 5, 2022, Ricch wrote a handwritten letter to his fans and posted a picture of it, providing an update on the mixtape and on his life: Been working hard on this Feed Tha Streets 3 album, getting back to my regular regimen and also been happier than I've been in a long time.

I understand things have escalated quickly and God has taken us to places we never would've imagined possible but I'm here for every challenge and obstacle. Thank You to everybody whose stayed supportive of me through all the glorious moments and all the hard times.

During my process I've been able to work close with some amazing people on a new tech company called, ROLL.

I want to be closer to my fans and show all the sides no one ever sees. I want to show my album process, my new journey of fatherhood and all the things that comes with the life of being RR.

Release and promotion
On October 22, 2022, Ricch's 24th birthday, he announced the mixtape and its release date, alongside its cover art, after revealing its existence a few times before. On November 13, 2022, he shared its tracklist, which also revealed the list of record producers and what tracks they produced.

Singles
The lead single of the mixtape, "Stop Breathing", was released on September 30, 2022. The second single, "Aston Martin Truck", was released on October 21, 2022. The third single, "Twin", which features fellow American rapper Lil Durk, was released on November 14, 2022.

Critical reception

Joshua Robinson of HotNewHipHop felt that it feels good for a mixtape although Ricch is less aggressive than usual, explaining that he "proves that and emphatically puts a pin in the intriguing first chapter of his career".

Track listing

Charts

References

2022 mixtape albums
Roddy Ricch albums
Atlantic Records albums
Albums produced by Cubeatz
Albums produced by JetsonMade
Albums produced by DJ Mustard